Models Inc. (UK: That Kind of Girl) is a 1952 American film noir crime film directed by Reginald Le Borg and starring Howard Duff and Coleen Gray.

Plot
A young woman gets involved in a racket in which beautiful young models marry for money.

Cast
 Howard Duff as Lennie Stone
 Coleen Gray as Rusty Faraday
 John Howard as John Stafford
 Marjorie Reynolds as Peggy Howard
 Louis Jean Heydt as Cronin
 Edwin Max as Looie (as Ed Max)
 Benny Baker as Freddy
 James Seay as Det. Sgt. Mooney
 Charles Cane as Big Jim
 Sue Carlton as Ann
 Lou Lubin as Max
 Paula Hill as Millie (as Mary Hill)
 Frank Ferguson as Joe Reynolds - the Banker

See also
 List of American films of 1952

External links
Film page at TCMDB

Review of film at New York Times

1952 films
1952 crime drama films
American black-and-white films
American crime drama films
Film noir
Films about modeling
Films directed by Reginald Le Borg
Films scored by Herschel Burke Gilbert
Universal Pictures films
1950s English-language films
1950s American films